The Fighting Hombre is a 1927 American silent Western film directed by Jack Nelson and starring Bob Custer, Mary O'Day and Bert Sprotte.

Cast
 Bob Custer as Bob Camp 
 Mary O'Day as Rose Martin 
 Bert Sprotte as Henry Martin 
 David Dunbar as 'Goldstud' Hopkins 
 Carlo Schipa as Tony Mendoza 
 Zita Makar as Marie Mendoza 
 Walter Maly as Lone Badger 
 Jack Anthony as The Sheriff

References

External links
 

1927 Western (genre) films
American black-and-white films
Film Booking Offices of America films
Films directed by Jack Nelson
Silent American Western (genre) films
1920s American films